During the nine-year Soviet–Afghan War in the 1980s and the subsequent Afghan civil war, the town of Khost was besieged for more than eleven years. Its airstrip's 3 km runway served as a base for helicopter operations by Soviet forces.

It began soon after the invasion of Afghanistan by Soviet troops, when Afghan guerillas took control of the only land route between Khost and Gardez, effectively putting a stop to the Soviet advance. 

At the end of July 1983, the forces of Jalaluddin Haqqani layed siege to two towns in Khost and the Tani, Mangal, Zazai and Waziri tribes began taking an active part in the fighting, despite being passive up until then. All of the aforementioned events coincided with former King Mohammed Zahir Shah's appeal for a united front, which caused rumours about the Royalists intending to establish a provisional government in a liberated Khost. However, Khost wasn't captured and by October, the Tani tribe had withdrawn from coalition due to a tribal rivalry with the Zadran. Many rebels also returned home as winter came on. By the end of December, government forces arriving from Gardez ended the siege of the two towns and recaputered Zazi Maidan.

Operation Magistral was an offensive launched to relieve it at the end of 1987. The first convoys reached Khost at the end of December 1987. When the main Soviet force had withdrawn, Mujahideen groups cut off Khost once again, as they had done since 1981.

Following the creation of the Commander's Shura, which united the Peshawar Seven and assault was coordinated to capture Khost, an assault which at least according to former special envoy to the Mujahideen Peter Tomsen was more an ISI operation than a Mujahideen one. This fighting was a co-ordinated attack by the forces of Hezb-e Islami of Gulbuddin Hekmatyar, Jalaluddin Haqqani and local Ahmadzai tribes led by Mohammad Nabi Mohammadi. The Ahmadzai were able to spearhead the assault after Hezb-e Islam and Haqqania suffered setbacks, and eventually able to capture the city and negotiate the surrender of the garrison resulting in victory on March 31, 1991.

References

Further reading
 De Ponfilly, Christophe(2001); Massoud l'Afghan; Gallimard; 
 Bear Trap: Afghanistan's Untold Story by Brigadier Mohammad Yousaf
 

Khost
Khost
Khost
Khost
History of Khost Province
1991 in Afghanistan